Chyron may refer to:

 Lower third, text in the lower third of a TV news display
 Chyron Corporation, making chyrons

See also 
 Chiron (disambiguation)
 Kiron (disambiguation)